The Silent Force Tour is a double DVD which was released by the symphonic metal/rock  band Within Temptation on November 18, 2005. In addition to the standard double DVD release, the deluxe edition includes a bonus CD. The album was re-released digitally on 14 May 2021.

The main concert features the band playing at the Java-eiland, Amsterdam. Three songs that were performed at the concert were not included on the release, being them "Somewhere", "Enter" and "Running Up that Hill". The song "World of Make Believe" was also scheduled to be played, but keyboardist Martijn Spierenburg felt "unprepared" to play this song live.

The DVD reached the second place on the Dutch DVD charts.

Content

Disc 1
Live concert at the Java Island, Amsterdam, live videos from two European summer festivals and the three music videos of off the album The Silent Force.

Concert from Java Eiland in Amsterdam

Live in 05, Helsinki, Finland, 2005

Live at Rock Werchter, Belgium, 2005

Music videos
 "Stand My Ground"
 "Memories"
 "Angels"

Disc 2
Special features
Backstage footage
2003-2005 tours and festivals
The Making of
The Silent Force album
The "Stand My Ground", "Memories" and "Angels" music videos
Impressions and Interviews
2004: De Boerderij – TMF special (NL)
2005: Bettina S (FI): "WT in Dubai" – TMF special
TMF Awards and MTV Newsflash (NL)
Live 2005 interview: The Voice (FI) and Kerrang!
Radio FM (UK)
Extras
Open Air Forest Theatre "Kersouwe" (NL) 2004
The Java Island special (NL) 2005
Photo gallery
Bloopers

Live CD
Concert from Java Eiland in Amsterdam. The track listing is the same as that of disc 1, but with the tracks "Aquarius" and "Caged" omitted. (These were later included on the "What Have You Done" maxi single).

Personnel

Sharon den Adel - vocals
Robert Westerholt - guitars
Ruud Jolie - guitars
Martijn Spierenburg - keyboards
Jeroen van Veen - bass
Stephen van Haestregt - drums

Guests
George Oosthoek - featured vocals on "The Other Half (Of Me)"
Martijn Westerholt - keyboards on "Candles"
Ivar de Graaf - drums on "Candles"
Michiel Papenhove - guitars on "Candles"

References

Within Temptation albums
2005 live albums
2005 video albums
Live video albums
GUN Records live albums
GUN Records video albums
Sony BMG video albums